Broderie may refer to:

Embroidery
Broderie (garden feature) a form of Baroque garden design
A French term for an auxiliary note in music